This is a list of notable people from Arkansas. Individuals on this list are either native-born Arkansans or emigrants who moved to Arkansas as their permanent home.

Actors

Joey Lauren Adams (born 1968), actress
Katherine Alexander (1898–1981), actress
Bronco Billy Anderson (1880–1971), vaudeville actor
Wes Bentley (born 1978), actor
Rodger Bumpass (born 1951), actor, best known for voicing Squidward Tentacles from the animated series SpongeBob SquarePants
Miriam Byrd-Nethery (1929–2003), actress
Natalie Canerday (born 1962), actress, Sling Blade, October Sky
John Carter (1927–2015), actor, originally from Conway County
Daniel Davis (born 1945), actor, best known as "Niles the butler" on television series The Nanny
Gail Davis (1925–1997), film actress, best known as Annie Oakley from 1950s television series
Clark Duke (born 1985), actor, Greek, Hearts Afire
Kimberly Foster (born 1961), actress, Dallas
Gauge (born 1980), adult film actress
Gil Gerard (born 1943), actor
Norris Goff (1906–1978), actor, best known as Abner of Lum and Abner
Elizabeth Gracen (born 1961), actress, Highlander: The Raven
Tess Harper (born 1950), actress
Georgia Holt (1926–2022), actress, singer; mother of Cher
Arthur Hunnicutt (1910–1979), actor, known for his portrayal of wise, grizzled, old rural characters
Brent Jennings (born 1969)
Brandon Keener (born 1974), actor
Donnie Keshawarz (born 1969), actor
Alan Ladd (1913–1964), actor
Chester Lauck (1902–1980), actor, best known as Lum of Lum and Abner
Marjorie Lawrence (1907–1979), actress, Metropolitan Opera diva
Jacob Lofland (born 1996), actor
Josh Lucas (born 1971), actor
Laurence Luckinbill (born 1934), actor
Rudy Ray Moore (1927–2008), actor
Ben Murphy (born 1942), actor, Alias Smith and Jones, Lottery!
Corin Nemec (born 1971), actor
George Newbern (born 1964), actor
Dick Powell (1904–1963), actor and director; founder of Four Star Television
William Ragsdale (born 1961), actor, Herman's Head, Grosse Pointe
Leon Russom (born 1941), actor, Prison Break
Wonderful Smith (1911–2008), actor and comedian
Norman Snow (born 1950), actor
Mary Steenburgen (born 1953), Oscar-winning actress
Kobe Tai (born 1972), adult film actress
Billy Bob Thornton (born 1955), actor, Oscar-winning screenwriter
Karri Turner (born 1966), actress
Karmyn Tyler (born 1974), actress
Sheryl Underwood (born 1963), actress, comedian, radio host
Jerry Van Dyke (1931–2018), actor, comedian, brother of Dick Van Dyke; resided on his ranch near Malvern

Artists
Larry D. Alexander (born 1953), artist and writer
Danielle Bunten Berry (1949–1998), video game designer
John Braden (1949–2004), writer, producer, director
Roy Buchanan (1939-1988), guitarist, singer, songwriter
Carl Ward Dudley (1910–1973), filmmaker and producer
George Fisher (1923–2003), political cartoonist
David Gordon Green (born 1975), filmmaker
Kenneth Johnson (born 1942), screenwriter, director
E. Fay Jones (1921–2004), architect and designer
Evan Lindquist (born 1936), artist, printmaker, Artist Laureate of Arkansas
Nate Powell (born 1978), comic book artist
Effie Anderson Smith (1869–1955), impressionist landscape painter, educator, feminist
Harry Thomason (born 1940), television producer
Edward Washburn (1831–1860), painter of The Arkansas Traveler
Donald Roller Wilson (born 1938), painter
Symone (drag queen) (born 1995), Model, actress & Winner of Rupaul's Drag Race

Authors

Margot Adler (1946–2014), journalist and correspondent
Brian Biggs (born 1968), author, illustrator, graphic artist
Dee Brown (1908–2002), author, historian, novelist
Helen Gurley Brown (1922–2012), author, editor-in-chief of Cosmopolitan magazine
Nancy A. Collins (born 1959), author
John Gould Fletcher (1886–1950), poet
John Grisham (born 1955), novelist
Dave Grossman (born 1956), author
Laurell K. Hamilton (born 1963), horror/fantasy author
Deborah Mathis (born 1953), journalist and author
Peter McGehee (1955–1991), novelist
Qui Nguyen, playwright and screenwriter 
Charles Portis (1933–2020), novelist
Leora Bettison Robinson (1840-1914), writer
John Robert Starr (1927–2000), journalist
Gina Wilkins (born 1954), novelist
Miller Williams (1930–2015), poet
C. Vann Woodward (1908–1999), historian
Carolyn D. Wright (1949–2016), poet

Businesspeople

William T. Dillard (1914–2002), head of Dillard's Department Stores
Max Frauenthal (1836–1914), Civil War hero, leading Conway merchant, and founding father of Heber Springs
Walter E. Hussman Jr. (born 1947), founder of WEHCO Media, Inc.
Johnelle Hunt (born 1932), co-founder of J. B. Hunt Transportation Services
Johnnie Bryan Hunt (1927–2006), co-founder of J. B. Hunt Transportation Services
John Harold Johnson (1918–2005), founder of Johnson Publishing Company
Jerry Jones (born 1942), owner of the Dallas Cowboys since 1989
Stephen Jones (born 1964), executive vice president/COO of the Dallas Cowboys
James Smith McDonnell (1899–1980), founder of McDonnell Aircraft
Charles Phillips (born 1959), CEO of Infor Global Solutions
Jackson T. Stephens (1923–2005), oilman and investment banker
Warren Stephens (born 1957), president, chairman, and CEO of Stephens Inc.
Don Tyson (1930–2011), Tyson Foods Poultry processing
John H. Tyson (born 1953), former CEO of Tyson Foods
Alice Walton (born 1949), daughter of Sam Walton, founded Llama Company
Jim Walton (born 1948), son of Sam Walton, chairman of Arvest Bank
John T. Walton (1946–2005), son of Sam Walton, former chairman of True North Venture Partners
Rob Walton (born 1944), son of Sam Walton, former chairman of Walmart
Sam Walton (1918–1992), founder of Wal-Mart Inc.
Kemmons Wilson (1913–2003), Holiday Inn hotel founder
Forrest L. Wood (1932–2020), founder of Ranger Boats

Military figures

John Hanks Alexander (1864–1894), pioneering African-American naval officer
James "Mo" Alley, World War II veteran and member of the famed "Easy Company"
Nicky Daniel Bacon (1945–2010), First Sergeant, U.S. Army, Medal of Honor recipient, Distinguished Service Cross, the Legion of Merit, two Bronze Stars and two Purple Hearts; director of the Arkansas Department of Veterans Affairs, United States delegate to normalize relations with Vietnam, president of the Congressional Medal of Honor Society, Chair Emeritus of the American Board for Certification in Homeland Security, Military Police Hall of Fame
William N. R. Beall (1825–1883), Confederate Brigadier General
Raynal Bolling (1877–1918), first high-ranking U.S. Army casualty in WWI
Solon Borland (1808–1864), Confederate Brigadier General
Maurice "Footsie" Britt (1919–1995), World War II soldier, Medal of Honor recipient, Distinguished Service Cross recipient, Silver Star recipient, first American soldier to receive the three highest medals for bravery; NFL player; Lt. Governor of Arkansas
William L. Cabell (1827–1911), Confederate Brigadier General
Thomas J. Churchill (1824–1905), Confederate Major General
Wesley Clark (born 1944), U.S. Army general, NATO Commander
Patrick Cleburne (1828–1864), Confederate Major General
James Conway (born 1947), US Marine Corps Lieutenant General
William Orlando Darby (1911–1945), first commander of the US Army Rangers
Herman Davis (1888–1923), Distinguished Service Cross recipient and World War I sniper
Thomas P. Dockery (1833–1898), Confederate Brigadier General
Edward Walter Eberle (1864–1929), U.S. Navy Chief of Naval Operations
James F. Fagan (1827–1893), Confederate Major General
Nathan G. Gordon (1916–2008), USN PBY pilot, received Medal of Honor for rescuing 15 downed aircrew members by landing his aircraft under enemy fire
Daniel C. Govan (1829–1911), Confederate Brigadier General
Carlos Hathcock (1942–1999), Marine sniper
Alexander T. Hawthorn (1825–1899), Confederate Brigadier General
Thomas Hindman (1828–1868), US Congressman and Confederate Major General
Lucius Roy Holbrook (1875–1952), US Major General
George Izard (1776–1828), US Army General, War of 1812
Field E. Kindley (1896–1920), World War I flying ace
Douglas MacArthur (1880–1964), US General of the Army, Medal of Honor recipient
Ewell Ross McCright (1907–1990), US Air Force Captain, World War II, Prisoner of War and Legion of Merit recipient
Pierce McKennon (1919–1947), World War II fighter ace veteran of RAF Eagle Squadron, 335thFS/4thFG, 20 German aircraft destroyed
Evander McNair (1820–1902), Confederate Brigadier General
Dandridge McRae (1829–1899), Confederate Brigadier General
Albert Pike (1809–1891), Confederate General, Freemason
John S. Roane (1817–1867), Brigadier General
Albert Rust (1818–1870), Confederate Brigadier General
James C. Tappan (1825–1906), Confederate Brigadier General
John Thach (1905–1981), US Navy Admiral, World War II flying ace
Frank Glasgow Tinker (1909–1939), Spanish Civil War volunteer fighter pilot
Corydon M. Wassell (1884–1958), U.S. Navy physician and medical missionary
Archibald Yell (1797–1847), brigadier general, killed at the Battle of Buena Vista during the Mexican–American War

Musicians

Kris Allen (born 1985), singer-songwriter, winner of the 8th season of American Idol
Black Oak Arkansas (formed 1963), Southern rock hillybilly psycho-boogie band
Big Bill Broonzy (1903–1958), blues singer-songwriter and guitarist
Shirley Brown (born 1947), soul singer
Sonny Burgess (1929–2017), Sun recording artist
Sarah Caldwell (1924–2006), opera conductor and director, violinist
Glen Campbell (1936–2017), country singer-songwriter, and actor
Johnny Cash (1932–2003), country singer-songwriter
Floyd Cramer (1933–1997), musician, most known for his piano instrumental "Last Date"
Roscoe Dash (born 1990), rapper
Iris DeMent (born 1961), country/folk singer-songwriter
Jim Dickinson (1941–2009), musician and producer
Beth Ditto (born 1981), singer with The Gossip
Bob Dorough (1923–2018), jazz musician and voice of Schoolhouse Rock!
Jimmy Driftwood (1907–1998), folk musician/songwriter, wrote "The Battle of New Orleans"
Barbara Fairchild (born 1950), country and gospel singer
Tav Falco (born 1945), musical performer, performance artist, actor, filmmaker, and photographer
Sandford C. Faulkner (1803–1874), wrote fiddle tune "Arkansas Traveler"
Lefty Frizzell (1928–1975), country music singer-songwriter
Al Green (born 1946), singer
Charles Christian Hammer (1953–2004), classical guitarist
Ronnie Hawkins (born 1935), rock musician
Levon Helm (1940–2012), rock musician
Barbara Hendricks (born 1948), opera singer
John S. Hilliard (1947–2019), composer
Wayland Holyfield (born 1942), songwriter
Buddy Jewell (born 1961), country musician
Louis Jordan (1908–1975), jazz musician and bandleader
Tracy Lawrence (born 1968), country musician
Amy Lee (born 1981), rock musician
Robert Lockwood Jr. (1915–2006), blues musician
W. Francis McBeth (1933–2012), composer
Robert McFerrin (1921–2006), operatic baritone
Patsy Montana (1914–1996), country musician
Ben Moody (born 1980), rock musician
Justin Moore (born 1984), country musician
Charlotte Moorman (1933–1991), cellist, performance artist
Conlon Nancarrow (1912–1997), composer
Ne-Yo (born 1979), R&B musician, songwriter
Joe Nichols (born 1976), country music artist
Smokie Norful (born 1975), gospel singer (reared in Arkansas)
Walter Norris (1931–2011), pianist and composer
K.T. Oslin (1942–2020), country musician
Twila Paris (born 1958), gospel musician
Art Porter Jr. (1961–1996), jazz saxophonist
Art Porter, Sr. (1934–1993), jazz pianist
Florence Price (1887–1953), composer
Collin Raye (born 1960), country musician
Wilbur Stephen "Bill" Rice (born 1939), country musician
Charlie Rich (1932–1995), rockabilly, jazz, blues, country, and gospel musician and pianist
Pharoah Sanders (born 1940), jazz saxophonist
W. Stephen Smith (born 1950), baritone opera singer, voice teacher and author
William Grant Still (1895–1978), composer
Fred Tackett (born 1945), songwriter and multi-instrumentalist
Johnnie Taylor (1934–2000), vocalist
Sister Rosetta Tharpe (1915–1973), vocalist, guitarist, the first great recording star of gospel music, considered the "godmother of rock and roll"
Conway Twitty (1933–1993), rock and roll and country music singer
Michael Utley (born 1985), songwriter, actor, musician, bit actor, member of Jimmy Buffett and the Coral Reefer Band and Club Trini
Junior Walker (1931–1995), Motown saxophonist
William Warfield (1920–2002), vocalist
Lenny Williams (born 1945), singer
Otis Williams (born 1941), singer
Sonny Boy Williamson II (1899–1965), blues musician
Viper (rapper) (born 1971) rapper, producer

Political figures

A–B
William Vollie Alexander Jr. (born 1934), Democratic US Representative 1969–1993
Dale Alford (1916–2000), US Representative from Little Rock 1959–1963; unsuccessful gubernatorial candidate in Democratic primary in 1962 and 1966
Denny Altes (born 1948), former member of both houses of the Arkansas State Legislature; Vietnam War veteran from Fort Smith
Morris S. Arnold (born 1941), US Appeals Court judge
Richard S. Arnold (1936–2004), US Appeals Court judge
Duncan Baird (born 1979), Arkansas state budget director since 2015; Republican former member of the Arkansas House of Representatives
Bob Ballinger (born 1974), Republican member of the Arkansas House of Representatives for Washington, Carroll, and Madison counties 
Jonathan Barnett (born 1955), state representative for Benton and Washington counties
Mike Beebe (born 1946), former governor of Arkansas
Mary ElizabethBentley (born 1961), Republican member of the Arkansas House of Representatives for Perry, Pope, Yell, and Conway counties since 2015; businesswoman and former nurse in Perryville
Edwin Ruthvin Bethune (born 1935), US Representative 1979–1985
Solon Borland (1808–1864), US Senator
Drew Bowers (1886–1985), Republican gubernatorial nominee in 1926 and 1928; assistant U.S. attorney in Little Rock
David Branscum (born 1958), Republican member of the Arkansas House of Representatives from Searcy County
Kelly Bryant (1908–1975), secretary of state
Dale Bumpers (1925–2016), U.S. Senator and Arkansas Governor
Preston C. Bynum (1939–2018), lobbyist and politician

C–D

Jim R. Caldwell (born 1936), first Republican to serve in the Arkansas State Senate in the 20th century, 1969 to 1978; Church of Christ minister retired in Tulsa, Oklahoma 
Ronald R. Caldwell (born 1951), Republican member of the Arkansas State Senate from Cross County
Hattie Caraway (1878–1951), first woman U. S. Senator
Davy Carter (born 1975), Speaker of the Arkansas House of Representatives
Francis Adams Cherry (1908–1965), governor 1953–1955
Marvin Childers (born 1961), former state representative from Mississippi County, lawyer and lobbyist for poultry industry in Little Rock
Marshall Chrisman (born 1933), Republican state representative from Franklin and Johnson counties, 1969–1970; gubernatorial candidate, 1980 and 1982
Alan Clark (born 1960), Arkansas Republican state senator from Garland County
Ann Clemmer (born 1958), Republican member of the Arkansas House of Representative from Saline County; professor of political science at the University of Arkansas at Little Rock
Bill Clinton (born 1946), 42nd president of the United States
Chelsea Clinton (born 1980), daughter of Bill and Hillary
Hillary Clinton (born 1947), First Lady of the United States (1993–2001), U.S. Senator from New York (2001–2009), U.S. Secretary of State (2009–2013), and 2016 Democratic nominee for president
Carl B. Close (1907–1980), Louisiana politician; native of Conway County
Osro Cobb (1904–1996), lawyer, Republican politician from Montgomery County and later Little Rock
Sterling R. Cockrill (born 1925), Republican former politician from Pulaski County; urban planner, businessman, artist 
Henry W. Conway (1793–1827), territorial delegate
John R. Cooper (born 1947), Republican member of the Arkansas State Senate from Craighead County
Donnie Copeland (born 1961), Pentecostal pastor in North Little Rock and Republican member of the Arkansas House of Representatives for District 38, 2015 to 2017
Tom Cotton (born 1977), U.S. Senator from Arkansas since 2015
Bruce Cozart (born 1955), politician and developer from Hot Springs
Marion H. Crank (1915–1994), Speaker of the Arkansas House, 1963–1964; Democratic gubernatorial nominee, 1968
Danny K. Davis (born 1941), U.S. Representative from Illinois
Gary Deffenbaugh (born 1949), Republican member of the Arkansas House of Representatives from Van Buren in Crawford County 
Jay Dickey (1939–2017), U.S. Representative from Arkansas's 4th congressional district, 1993–2001
Jim Dotson (born 1978), Republican member of the Arkansas House of Representatives from Bentonville
Dan Douglas (born 1957), Republican member of the Arkansas House of Representatives from Bentonville
Trevor Drown (born c. 1970), Republican member of the Arkansas House of Representatives for Pope and Van Buren counties since 2015

E–G

Lance Eads (born 1968), Republican member of the Arkansas House of Representatives for Washington County since 2015; unseated Randy Alexander in 2014 Republican primary
Les Eaves (born 1967), Republican member of the Arkansas House of Representatives for White County since 2015
Joycelyn Elders (born 1933), former Surgeon General of the United States
Jane English (born 1940), member of the Arkansas State Senate from North Little Rock since 2013; former member of the Arkansas House of Representatives
Jon Eubanks (born 1951), state representative for Logan County since 2011
Joe Farrer (born 1962), state representative from Lonoke County
Orval Eugene Faubus (1910–1994), governor 1955–1967
Jake Files (born 1972), state senator from Fort Smith since 2011
Charlene Fite (born 1950), Republican state representative for Crawford County since 2013
Lanny Fite (born c. 1949), Republican state representative for Saline County since 2015, former county judge
Scott Flippo (born 1980), state senator from Baxter, Boone, and Marion Counties; businessman in Bull Shoals
Stephanie Flowers (born 1953), state senator from Pine Bluff and former state representative; attorney
Vivian Flowers (born c. 1969), state representative from Pine Bluff
Clay Ford (1938–2013), member of both the Arkansas and Florida House of Representatives
Vince Foster (1945–1993), Presidential aide
Woody Freeman (born 1946), businessman and 1984 Republican gubernatorial nominee
J. William Fulbright (1905–1995), U.S. Senator
Augustus H. Garland (1832–1899), U.S. Attorney General
Jeremy Gillam (born 1976), Republican state representative from Lonoke County
John W. Grabiel (1867–1928), Republican gubernatorial nominee in 1922 and 1924
Michael John Gray (born 1976), Democratic member of the Arkansas House for Independence, Jackson, White, and Woodruff counties since 2015
Michelle Gray (born 1976), Republican member of the Arkansas House of Representative for Independence, Izard, Sharp, and Stone counties since 2015
Kenny Guinn (1936–2010), Governor of Nevada 1999 to 2007; Arkansas native

H–K

Kim Hammer (born 1958), Republican member of the Arkansas House of Representatives from Saline County; Baptist clergyman in Benton
John Paul Hammerschmidt (1922–2015), former U.S. Representative of Arkansas's 3rd congressional district; congressional sponsor of the Buffalo National River
Fonda F. Hawthorne (born 1956), Democratic former member of the Arkansas House of Representatives for Little River County
John Heiskell (1872–1972), US Senator and newspaper publisher
Kenneth Henderson (born c. 1963), member of the Arkansas House of Representatives for Pope County; real estate developer in Russellville
Jim Hendren (born 1963), member of the Arkansas State Senate from Benton County since 2013; former member of the Arkansas House of Representatives
Kim Hendren (born 1938), former member of the Arkansas State Senate and the Arkansas House of Representatives from Benton County
Ben C. Henley (1907–1987), Arkansas state Republican chairman 1955–1962, lawyer and businessman in Harrison
J. Smith Henley (1917–1997), federal judge in Fayetteville, retired to senior status in Harrison; brother of Ben Henley
Bart Hester (born 1977), Arkansas state senator from Benton County 
Jimmy Hickey Jr. (born 1966), Arkansas state senator from Texarkana
Grant Hodges (born 1990), Arkansas state representative for Benton County since 2015
Jim L. Holt (born 1965), Republican politician
Mike Huckabee (born 1955), governor 1996–2007
Asa Hutchinson (born 1950), former US representative
Donna Hutchinson (born 1949), member of the Arkansas House of Representatives from Benton County
Jeremy Hutchinson (born 1974), Arkansas state senator
Tim Hutchinson (born 1949), former US representative and former US senator
Timothy Chad Hutchinson (born 1974), former member of the Arkansas House of Representatives from Benton County
Lane Jean (born 1958), Arkansas state representative from Columbia, Lafayette, and Miller counties; former mayor of Magnolia
Bob Johnson (born 1953), Democratic member of the Arkansas House of Representatives for Pulaski County since 2013; former justice of the peace
James D. Johnson (1924–2010), Arkansas Supreme Court Justice, segregationist leader
Robert W. Johnson (1814–1879), U.S. and Confederate States Senator
J. B. Judkins, Arkansas state senator, elected president of the state's senate in 1883 
Allen Kerr (born 1956), former member of the Arkansas House of Representatives for Pulaski County

L–M
Jack Ladyman (born 1947), mechanical engineer and Republican member of the Arkansas House of Representatives for Craighead County since 2015
Benjamin Travis Laney (1896–1977), governor
Andrea Lea (born 1957), Arkansas State Auditor 2015 – 2023; Republican former member of the Arkansas House of Representatives for Pope County
Tim Lemons (born c. 1962), Republican member of the Arkansas House of Representatives for District 43 in Lonoke County
Kelley Linck (born 1963), Republican member of the Arkansas House of Representatives for Marion County
Blanche Lincoln (born 1960), former U.S. Senator and former U.S. Representative
Marilyn Lloyd (1929–2018), former U.S. Representative from Tennessee
A. Lynn Lowe (1936–2010), former Arkansas Republican state chairman and unsuccessful nominee for U.S. House of Representatives (1966) and governor (1978)
Mark Lowery (born 1957), member of the Arkansas House of Representatives from Pulaski County since 2013
Robin Lundstrum (born c. 1962), Republican member of the Arkansas House of Representatives for Benton and Washington counties since 2015
Mark R. Martin (born 1968), Secretary of State of Arkansas
John L. McClellan (1896–1977), Chairman Senate Appropriations Committee
Mark McElroy (born 1956), Democratic member of the Arkansas House of Representative for Desha, Chicot and Ashley counties since 2013
Sid McMath (1912–2003), former Arkansas Governor, trial lawyer, and Marine Corps General
Stephen Meeks (born 1970), Republican member of the Arkansas House of Representatives from Faulkner County; brother of David Meeks
Gary Miller (born 1948), U.S. Representative from California
Joshua D. "Josh" Miller (born 1981), member of the Arkansas House of Representatives from Heber Springs
Wilbur Daigh Mills (1909–1992), chairman of United States House Ways and Means Committee
Isaac Murphy (1799–1882), Governor of Arkansas

N–R
Micah Neal (born 1974), Republican member of the Arkansas House of Representatives from Springdale
Milton Nicks (born 1950), state representative for Crittenden and Cross counties since 2015; Baptist pastor in Earle, resident of Marion, Arkansas
George E. Nowotny (born 1932), state representative from Sebastian County 1967–1972
Isaac Parker (1838–1896), "Hanging Judge" of Fort Smith
Danny L. Patrick (1941–2009), Republican state representative from Madison and Carroll counties 1967–1970
Rebecca Petty (born c. 1970), Republican member of the Arkansas House of Representatives for Benton County; advocate of child crime victims, resident of Rogers
Mathew Pitsch (born 1963), Republican member of the Arkansas House of Representatives from Fort Smith since 2015
Carolyn Pollan (born 1937), state representative from Sebastian County 1975–1999
David Pryor (born 1934), US Senator, governor, US representative; founding dean of the Clinton School of Public Service
Mark Pryor (born 1963), U.S. Senator; son of David Pryor
Jim Ranchino (1936–1978), political scientist, consultant, and pollster
 Donald A. Quarles, Deputy Secretary of Defense and communications engineer
Terry Rice (born 1954), Republican member of the Arkansas Senate, former member of the Arkansas House of Representatives; businessman and rancher in Waldron
Joseph T. Robinson (1872–1937), senate majority leader and vice presidential candidate
Tommy F. Robinson (born 1942), sheriff, US representative
Winthrop Rockefeller (1912–1973), Governor of Arkansas
Winthrop Paul Rockefeller (1948–2006), lieutenant governor
Mike Ross (born 1961), U.S. Representative 2001–2013; unsuccessful Democratic gubernatorial nominee in 2014
Laurie Rushing (born 1968), member of the Arkansas House of Representatives for Garland and Hot Spring counties since 2015; real estate broker in Hot Springs
J. T. Rutherford (1921–2006), U.S. Representative from Texas

S–Z
William H. "Bill" Sample (born 1946), member of both houses of the Arkansas General Assembly from Hot Springs since 2005
David J. Sanders (born 1975), Arkansas state senator from Pulaski County; former member of the Arkansas House of Representatives
Sarah Huckabee Sanders (born 1982), White House Press Secretary
Max Sandlin (born 1952), U.S. Representative from Texas
Monroe Schwarzlose (1902–1990), maverick gubernatorial candidate
William S. Sessions (1930–2020), FBI Director
Ambrose H. Sevier (1801–1848), US Senator, "father of Arkansas statehood"
Lottie Shackelford (born 1941), Democratic National Committee Vice Chair
Jim Sheets (1931–2020), state representative 1967–1968; first Republican to represent Benton County in legislature in the 20th century
Mary Lou Slinkard (born 1943), state representative from Benton County since 2009
Brandt Smith (born 1959), state representative since 2015 for Craighead County; former Southern Baptist missionary
John W. Snyder (1895–1985), U.S. Treasury Secretary
Vic Snyder (born 1947), US Representative 1997–2011
William L. Spicer (1918–1991), chairman of the Arkansas Republican Party 1962–1964; intraparty rival of Winthrop Rockefeller
Greg Standridge (1967–2017), Arkansas state senator for Newton, Pope, Boone, Carroll, and Van Buren counties since 2015; insurance agent in Russellville
Gary Stubblefield (born 1951), Arkansas state senator from Franklin County
James Sturch (born 1990), Republican member of the Arkansas House of Representatives for Independence County since 2015
Dan A. Sullivan (born 1950), Arkansas state representative for Craighead and Greene counties since 2015
Dwight Tosh (born 1948), state representative since 2015 from Jonesboro; retired state police officer
Wallace Townsend (1882–1979), attorney and Republican politician
DeAnn Vaught (born 1970), farmer and member of the Arkansas House of Representatives for Sevier County
Dave Wallace (born 1948), member of the Arkansas House of Representatives from Mississippi and Poinsett counties since 2015; decorated Vietnam War veteran
Wes Watkins (born 1938), U.S. Representative from Oklahoma
Bruce Westerman (born 1967), majority leader of the Arkansas House
Frank Durward White (1933–2003), governor 1981–1983
Eddie Joe Williams (born 1954), state senator and former mayor
James Lee Witt (born 1944), former FEMA Director
Judy Petty Wolf (born 1943), former state representative
Richard Womack (born 1974), state representative from Arkadelphia
Shawn Womack (born 1972), judge of the Arkansas 14th Judicial District; Republican former member of both houses of the Arkansas legislature from Baxter County
Jon Woods (born 1977), state senator 
James Word (born c. 1953), Democratic former member of the Arkansas House of Representatives for Jefferson and Lincoln counties
Marshall Wright (born 1976), Democratic member of the Arkansas House of Representatives for Monroe, St. Francis, Woodruff, and Lee counties since 2011

Scientists and physicians
Moses T. Clegg (1876–1918), bacteriologist noted for his work in Leprosy
Joycelyn Elders (born 1933), former Surgeon General of the United States
Mary L. Good (1931–2019), former chair and first female member of the American Chemical Society board
Samuel L. Kountz (1930–1981), pioneer in organ transplant surgery
Trent Pierce, family practitioner; chairman of the Arkansas Medical Board
William L. McMillan (1936–1984), National Academy of Sciences physicist noted for his research on superconductors
Taylor Wilson (born 1994), nuclear physics prodigy; youngest person to achieve fusion, at the age of 14
Gazi Yaşargil (born 1925), named "Neurosurgery's Man of the Century" by the Congress of Neurological Surgeons

Social figures
Daisy Bates (1914–1999), civil rights leader and activist
Melba Pattillo Beals (born 1941), civil rights activist and member of the Little Rock Nine
Minnijean Brown-Trickey (born 1941), civil rights activist and member of the Little Rock Nine
Eldridge Cleaver (1935–1998), activist
Elizabeth Eckford (born 1941), civil rights activist and member of the Little Rock Nine
Ernest Green (born 1941), civil rights activist and member of the Little Rock Nine 
Robert L. Hill (1892–1963), black leader at Elaine Race Riot
Scipio Africanus Jones (1863–1943), attorney
Gloria Ray Karlmark (born 1942), civil rights activist and member of the Little Rock Nine
Carlotta Walls LaNier (born 1942), civil rights activist and member of the Little Rock Nine 
Terrence Roberts (born 1941), civil rights activist and member of the Little Rock Nine
Adolphine Fletcher Terry (1882–1976), social activist
Louise Thaden (1905–1979), aviation pioneer
Jefferson Thomas (1942–2010), civil rights activist and member of the Little Rock Nine 
Cephas Washburn (1793–1860), Indian missionary

Sportspeople

James Anderson (born 1989), professional basketball player
Shawn Andrews (born 1982), professional football player
Stacy Andrews (born 1981), professional football player
Herbert (Geese) Ausbie (born 1938), professional basketball player with Harlem Globetrotters
Gene Bearden (1920–2004), professional baseball player
Alan Belcher (born 1984), professional MMA Fighter
Earl Bell (born 1955), Olympic pole vaulter
Mike Brisiel (born 1983), professional football player
Lou Brock (1939–2020), professional baseball player, Hall of Famer
Ray Brown (born 1962), professional football player, Arkansas State University alumnus
T.J. Brown (born 1990), professional mixed martial arts fighter
Paul "Bear" Bryant (1913–2016), football coach
Brandon Burlsworth (1976–1999), college football player
A. J. Burnett (born 1977), professional baseball player
Pat Burrell (born 1976), professional baseball player
Bill Carr (1909–1966), Olympic runner and 2-time gold medalist
Maurice Carthon (born 1961), professional football player
Charles Clay (born 1989), professional football player 
Nathaniel Clifton (1922–1990), professional Hall of Fame basketball player
Mike Conley Jr. (born 1987), professional basketball player
John Daly (born 1966), professional golfer
Tank Daniels (born 1981), professional football player
Willie Davis (1940–2010), professional baseball player
Dizzy Dean (1910–1974), professional baseball player, Hall of Famer
Bill Dickey (1907–1993), professional baseball player, Hall of Famer
Sid Eudy (born 1960), professional wrestler
Jeremy Evans (born 1987), professional basketball player
Derek Fisher (born 1974), professional basketball player
Wes Gardner (born 1961), professional baseball player
Craig Gentry (born 1983), professional baseball player
Brett Goode (born 1984), professional football player
Charles Greene (born 1944), Olympic sprinter
Ed Hamm (1906–1982), Olympic long-jump gold medalist
Dan Hampton (born 1957), professional football player, NFL Hall of Fame member
Chris Harris (born 1982), professional football player
Demetrius Harris (born 1991), professional football player
Dutch Harrison (1910–1982), professional golfer
Marcus Harrison (born 1984), professional football player
Red Hickey (1917–2006), professional football player and coach
Peyton Hillis (born 1986), professional football player
Jim Hines (born 1946), track and field athlete
Zach Hocker (born 1991), professional football player
Cedric Houston (born 1982), professional football player
Don Hutson (1913–1997), professional football player, NFL Hall of Fame member
Travis Jackson (1903-1987), professional baseball player, Hall of Fame member
Joe Johnson (born 1981), professional basketball player
Wes Johnson, professional baseball coach
Matt Jones (born 1983), professional football player
Al Joyner (born 1960), track and field Olympian
Jakob Junis (born 1992), baseball pitcher for the San Francisco Giants
Ken Kavanaugh (1916–2007), professional football player and coach
George Kell (1922–2009), professional baseball player, Hall of Famer
Don Kessinger (born 1942), professional baseball player and manager
Greg Lasker (born 1964), professional football player
Cliff Lee (born 1978), professional baseball pitcher
Sonny Liston (1932–1970), professional boxer, World Heavyweight Champion
Sherm Lollar (1924–1977), professional baseball player
Ryan Mallett (born 1988), professional football player
Mark Martin (born 1959), championship NASCAR driver
Darren McFadden (born 1987), professional football player
Kevin McReynolds (born 1959), professional baseball player
Bryce Mitchell (born 1994), professional mixed martial arts fighter
Sidney Moncrief (born 1957), professional basketball player
Rick Monday (born 1945), professional baseball player, sportscaster
Malik Monk (born 1998), professional basketball player
Tommy Morrison (1969–2013), professional boxer, two-time heavyweight champion 
Dustin Moseley (born 1981), professional baseball player
Larry Nixon (born 1950), professional sport fisherman
Houston Nutt (born 1957), collegiate football coach; quarterback; basketball player
Frank Okam (born 1985), professional football player
Blake Parker (born 1985), professional baseball player
Jermey Parnell (born 1986), professional football player
Joe Perry (1927–2011), professional football player
Mitch Petrus (1987–2019), professional football player
Scottie Pippen (born 1965), professional basketball player, Hall of Famer
Elijah Pitts (1938–1998), professional football player and coach
Bobby Portis (born 1995), professional basketball player
Anthony Randolph (born 1989), professional basketball player
Brooks Robinson (born 1937), professional baseball player, Hall of Famer
Preacher Roe (1916–2008), professional baseball player
Keena Rothhammer (born 1957), Olympic swimmer
Johnny Sain (1917–2006), professional baseball player
Elbert Shelley (born 1964), professional football player
Rod Smith (born 1970), professional football player
Drew Smyly (born 1989), professional baseball player
Drew Sutton (born 1983), professional baseball player
Barry Switzer (born 1937), football coach
Jermain Taylor (born 1978), professional boxer
Cedric Thornton (born 1988), professional football player
Charley Thornton (1937–2004), sports figure
Arky Vaughan (1912–1952), professional baseball player, Hall of Famer
Harry Vines (1938–2006), wheelchair basketball coach
Lon Warneke (1909–1976), professional baseball player
Sonny Weems (born 1986), professional basketball player
Corey Williams (born 1980), professional football player
Damian Williams (born 1988), professional football player
DeAngelo Williams (born 1983), professional football player
Kevin Williams (born 1980), professional football player
Corliss Williamson (born 1973), professional basketball player
Payton Willis (born 1998), basketball player in the Israeli Basketball Premier League
Travis Wood (born 1987), professional baseball player

Other Arkansans
Larry P. Arnn, president of Hillsdale College since 2000
Matt Besser (born 1967), comedian
James Black (1800–1872), manufacturer of the Bowie knife
Ben M. Bogard (1868–1951), clergyman
George W. Bond (1891–1974), educator and college president
Boogie2988 (born 1974), internet personality. real name Steven Williams
Richard O. "Dick" Covey (born 1946), astronaut
Jesse Dirkhising (1986–1999), crime victim
Bill Doolin (1858–1896), outlaw and founder of the Wild Bunch, born in Johnson County
 Mack Ray Edwards (1918–1971), child sex abuser/serial killer; committed suicide by hanging in his prison cell
Minnie Rutherford Fuller (1868-1946), farmer, broker, temperance leader, suffragist
Edwin R. Gilliland (1909–1973), chemical engineer
Elizabeth Ward Gracen (born 1961), Miss America, actress
Jack Graham (born 1950), pastor of Prestonwood Baptist Church in Plano, Texas
Connie Hamzy (born 1955), prolific rock groupie noted as "Sweet, Sweet Connie" in the Grand Funk Railroad 1973 song "We're An American Band"
Bill Hicks (1961–1994), comedian
T. J. Holmes (born 1977), CNN weekday anchor
Rex Humbard (1919–2007), televangelist
D. N. Jackson (1895–1968), clergyman
Kenneth Johnson (born 1942), writer, director and producer
Paula Jones (born 1966), sued President Bill Clinton for sexual harassment
Nan Keohane (born 1940), president of Duke University
Ralphie May (1972–2017), comedian
Martha Beall Mitchell (1918–1976), wife of John N. Mitchell
Jeff Nichols (born 1978), screenwriter and director
Freeman Owens (1890–1979), pioneer in cinematography
Scott E. Parazynski (born 1961), astronaut
Theodore Rinaldo (1944–2000), charismatic religious leader, businessman, and convicted child sex offender
John Selman (1839–1896), outlaw
Savvy Shields (born 1995), Miss America 2017
Amarillo Slim (1928–2012), professional poker player
Steve Stephens, radio and television host
Heath Stocks, convicted murderer who killed his family in Lonoke
Debbye Turner (born 1967), Miss America 1990, television host and news anchor
Terri Utley (born 1962), Miss USA 1982
John Joshua Webb (1847–1882), gunslinger
Roger L. Worsley (born 1937), educator

See also

 List of Arkansas suffragists
Lists of Americans

References